Twin anemia-polycythemia sequence (TAPS) is a form of chronic inter-twin transfusion. It is distinguished from classic twin-to-twin transfusion syndrome by differing red blood cell counts between the fetuses, a relative lack of symptoms and a lack of oligohydramnios or polyhydramnios among the fetuses.

Monochorionic twin pregnancy complication

Diagnosis and staging 

Different stages of TAPS are identified using the criteria as shown in the following tables.

Postnatal classification

Treatment 

The use of the so-called Solomon technique or dichorionization in fetoscopic laser therapy for twin-to-twin transfusion syndrome is proven to be beneficial in preventing post-laser TAPS. With this technique, not only all anastomoses are coagulated (closed) but also a line is drawn between those in order to coagulate anastomoses that might not (yet) be visible during fetoscopy. It should be stressed that the success of such a technique is highly dependent on the specific situation. For example, when one of the fetuses obstructs the view on the vascular equator (the part of the placenta where the anastomoses need to be coagulated), complete dichorionization by the Solomon technique might not be possible.

Perinatal outcome

See also
Vanishing twin
Twin-to-twin transfusion syndrome

References

External links
International Clinical Trial for best treatment for TAPS
TAPS Support- Patient run advocacy website
The TTTS Foundation

Pathology of pregnancy, childbirth and the puerperium
Syndromes
Twin